Both Sides of Midnight is a live album by American saxophonist Dexter Gordon recorded at the Jazzhus Montmartre in Copenhagen, Denmark in 1967. It was released on the Black Lion label as The Montmatre Collection Vol. 1, then re-released with an additional track and different title in 1988 to capitalize on the success of the film Round Midnight.

Critical reception 

AllMusic critic Michael G. Nastos stated "A well-recorded live date, one of many Gordon did at the Montmartre, this easily ranks as one of Gordon's best, just shy of his magnum opus Homecoming".

Track listing 
 "Devilette" (Ben Tucker) – 12:37
 "For All We Know" (J. Fred Coots, Sam M. Lewis) – 8:38
 "Doxy" (Sonny Rollins) – 7:08
 "Sonnymoon for Two" (Rollins) – 15:39
 "Misty" (Erroll Garner) – 9:12 Bonus track on 1988 release

Personnel 
Dexter Gordon – tenor saxophone
Kenny Drew – piano
Niels-Henning Ørsted Pedersen – bass
Albert Heath – drums

References 

Black Lion Records live albums
Dexter Gordon live albums
1981 live albums
Albums recorded at Jazzhus Montmartre